Orocrambus punctellus is a species of moth in the family Crambidae. It is endemic to New Zealand. It is classified as "Data Deficient" by the Department of Conservation.

Taxonomy 
It was described by George Vernon Hudson in 1950 using a specimen collected by George Howes at Portobello in Dunedin and named Crambus punctellus. In 1975 D. E. Gaskin transferred this species to the genus Orocrambus. The holotype specimen is held at the Museum of New Zealand Te Papa Tongarewa.

Description 
Hudson described the species as follows:

Distribution 
This species is endemic to New Zealand. It has only been recorded from the type locality at Otago Peninsula.

Biology and behaviour 
Very little is known of the biology of this species. The host species for the larvae of this moth is unknown. Adults have been recorded on wing in March.

Conservation status 

This species has been classified as having the "Data Deficient" conservation status under the New Zealand Threat Classification System.

References

External links
Image of holotype

Crambinae
Moths described in 1950
Moths of New Zealand
Taxa named by George Hudson
Endemic fauna of New Zealand
Endemic moths of New Zealand